NGDS may refer to:
National Gamete Donation Service, a British organization for sperm, egg and embryo donation
National Geothermal Data System, an American geothermal data network
NGD Studios, a former name of the Argentine video game developer Nimble Giant Entertainment
Ninja Gaiden: Dragon Sword, a 2008 video game